This is a list of dessert sauces. A dessert sauce is a sauce that serves to add flavor, moisture, texture and color to desserts. Dessert sauces may be cooked or uncooked.

Dessert sauces
 Butterscotch
 Caramel sauce
 Chancaca 
 Chocolate gravy
 Chocolate syrup 
 Coulis
 Cream
 Crème anglaise 
 Custard
 Fruit curd 
 Ganache
 Hard sauce – includes brandy butter, rum butter and sherry butter
 Hot fudge
 Latik 
 Magic Shell 
 Rainbow sauce 
 Rumtopf 
 Slatko 
 Strawberry sauce
 Wet walnuts

See also

 Ganache
 List of desserts
 List of sauces

References

 
Sauces